Hearts is one of the four suits in playing cards of both the French deck and the German deck.

In Bridge, for which in Germany the French deck is common, it is called by its French name, Cœur. In games using German-suited cards the suit of Hearts is often called "Red" (Rot). In the game of Watten, the King of Hearts is the highest Trump.

This suit was invented in 15th century Germany and is a survivor from a large pool of experimental suit signs created to replace the Latin suits.

Name 
The origin of the term "heart" to describe the symbol, which only very marginally resembles a true heart, is not known. In general, equivalents in other languages also mean "heart".

Characteristics 
The heart typically has a form of cardioid, the lower part of which ends in a point. The symbol is drawn with its tip down, the two lobes of the cardioid pointing upwards. Generally, the hearts are coloured red.

French pattern 
The following gallery shows the hearts of a 52-card deck of French playing cards. Not shown is the Knight of Hearts, used in tarot card games:

German pattern 
The gallery below shows a suit of Hearts from a German suited deck of 32 cards. The pack is of the Saxonian pattern:

Coding 
The symbol ♥ is already in the CP437 and therefore also in the WGL4. In Unicode, a black heart ♥ and a white ♡ heart are defined:

References 

Card suits
Heart symbols